The 2021 Arab Cup U-17 was to be the fourth edition of the Arab Cup U-17. It was scheduled to be hosted by Morocco from 29 July to 15 August 2021. The tournament was initially scheduled to be held from 1 to 17 July, but was postponed indefinitely, and later cancelled.

Teams

Draw 
The draw took place on 5 July 2021 in Cairo, Egypt.

Group stage
The group winners and runners-up advance to the quarter-finals.

All times are local, WAT (UTC+1).

Group A

Group B

Group C

Group D

Knockout stage
In the knockout stage, penalty shoot-out is used to decide the winner if necessary (no extra time is played).

Bracket

Quarter-finals

Semi-finals

Final

See also 
2021 Arab Cup U-20 
2021 Arab Women's Cup

References

Arab Cup U-17
Arab
Arab
Arab
Arab
Arab
Arab Cup U17, 2021